Hermann von Ramberg (24 November 1820, in Vienna – 26 December 1899, in Graz) was an Austrian statesman who served as acting Ban of Croatia-Slavonia in 1883.

1820 births
1899 deaths
Politicians from Vienna
Austrian politicians
Bans of Croatia